Robert Danforth Skelton (June 25, 1903 – June 25, 1977) was an American competition swimmer, Olympic champion, and former world record-holder.

Biography
Skelton was born in Wilmette, Illinois. He attended Northwestern University in Evanston, Illinois, where he swam for the Northwestern Wildcats swimming and diving team in National Collegiate Athletic Association (NCAA) competition.  

Skelton competed at the 1924 Summer Olympics in Paris, where he won a gold medal in the men's 200-meter breaststroke event. Skelton finished in 2:56.6, decisively defeating Belgian swimmer Joseph De Combe (2:59.2), and fellow American Bill Kirschbaum (3:01.0). He was the first American to set a world record for the 200-meter breaststroke.

Skelton died in Houston, Texas in 1977; he was 74 years old.

See also
 List of members of the International Swimming Hall of Fame
 List of Northwestern University alumni
 List of Olympic medalists in swimming (men)
 World record progression 200 metres breaststroke

References

Sources
 
  Robert Skelton (USA) – Honor Pioneer Swimmer profile at International Swimming Hall of Fame

1903 births
1977 deaths
People from Wilmette, Illinois
American male breaststroke swimmers
World record setters in swimming
Northwestern Wildcats men's swimmers
Olympic gold medalists for the United States in swimming
Swimmers at the 1924 Summer Olympics
Medalists at the 1924 Summer Olympics
20th-century American people